Dieze may refer to 

Dieze, a river in the Netherlands
Fort Dieze, a former fortress near ’s-Hertogenbosch
Johann Andreas Dieze (1729–1785), a German Hispanist and librarian